Electro Glide in Blue is the second studio album by English electronic music group Apollo 440. It was first released on 3 March 1997 in the United Kingdom by Stealth Sonic Recordings and Epic Records and on 9 September 1997 in the United States by 550 Music. The album features Charles Bukowski, Billy Mackenzie, and a tribute to Gene Krupa; all three of whom had died by the time of the album's release. Its title is a reference to the 1973 film Electra Glide in Blue.

In popular culture
"Stealth Mass in F#m" was played several times on BBC Radio 1 on 31 August 1997, when their regular schedule was suspended due to the death of Diana, Princess of Wales.

The title track was featured on the soundtrack to the 1998 film Homegrown, and in episode 1 of Blue Jam.

Track listing
 "Stealth Overture" – 1:00 (Trevor Gray, Elizabeth Gray, Noko)
 "Ain't Talkin' 'bout Dub" – 4:30 (Edward Van Halen, Alex Van Halen, Michael Anthony, David Lee Roth, Noko)
 "Altamont Super-Highway Revisited" – 6:33 (Noko)
 "Electro Glide in Blue" – 8:36 (Trevor Gray, Howard Gray, Ewan MacFarlane)
 "Vanishing Point" – 7:27 (Noko)
 "Tears of the Gods" – 6:18 Dialogue: Charles Bukowski (Noko, Trevor Gray, Howard Gray, Dr. John Creaux)
 "Carrera Rapida" (Theme from "Rapid Racer") – 6:48 (Noko, Trevor Gray, Howard Gray, Ian Hoxley)
 "Krupa" – 6:15 (Noko, Trevor Gray, Howard Gray)
 "White Man's Throat" – 4:54 (Noko, Howard Gray, Ian Hoxley)
 "Pain in Any Language" – 8:40 Vocals: Billy Mackenzie (Noko, Billy MacKenzie)
 "Stealth Mass in F#m" – 6:35 (Trevor Gray, E.Gray)
 "Raw Power" - 3:50 Not available on some releases. (Noko, Trevor Gray, Howard Gray, Ian Hoxley)

Certifications

Release history

References

External links 
 

1997 albums
Apollo 440 albums